The Granville Fuller House is a Queen Anne style home located at 2027 Galena St, in Aurora, Colorado, United States. It was built in 1892, and is listed on the National Register of Historic Places. The house is one of only a few surviving and intact houses commissioned by Aurora's founder, real estate developer Donald Fletcher.

Architecture
The house is a Queen Anne brick residence. It was covered with stucco that was scored to look like stone. The house has the characteristic asymmetric design with a steep roof and bay windows that are characteristic of the style.

See also
National Register of Historic Places listings in Adams County, Colorado

References

External links
Aurora Museum

Houses in Aurora, Colorado
Houses on the National Register of Historic Places in Colorado
Queen Anne architecture in Colorado
Houses in Arapahoe County, Colorado
National Register of Historic Places in Arapahoe County, Colorado
Houses completed in 1892
1892 establishments in Colorado